Nizhny Palnik is a rural locality (a selo) and the administrative center of Palnikovskoye Rural Settlement, Permsky District, Perm Krai, Russia. The population was 787 as of 2010. There are 19 streets.

Geography 
Nizhny Palnik is located on the Babka River, 59 km south of Perm (the district's administrative centre) by road. Chelyaba is the nearest rural locality.

References 

Rural localities in Permsky District